Tarnawa Dolna is a village in the administrative district of Gmina Zagórz, within Sanok County, Subcarpathian Voivodeship, in south-eastern Poland.

In 2006 the village had a population of 940.

History

During the German occupation (World War II), the Gruszka mountain near Tarnawa Dolna was the site of a German massacre of 112 Poles, who were previously imprisoned in nearby Sanok after trying to escape the Germans to take refuge in Hungary (see also: Nazi crimes against the Polish nation).

Notable people
 (1922–1946), member of the Polish resistance movement in World War II
 (1925–1946), Polish anti-communist partisan and former forced labourer under Germany

References

Tarnawa Dolna
Nazi war crimes in Poland